Highway 792 is a provincial highway in the Canadian province of Saskatchewan. It runs from Highway 12 to Highway 40 near Leask. Highway 792 is about 31 km (19 mi.) long.

Highway 792 also passes near Royal Lake and the Muskeg Lake Cree Nation.

See also 
Roads in Saskatchewan
Transportation in Saskatchewan

References 

792